Peruvian Socialist Movement, was a political party in Peru founded in 1989, through a split in the Mariateguist Unified Party (PUM). Leaders of MSP included Carlos Tapia and Sinesio López. It contested on the lists of ASI in the municipal elections 1989 and on the lists of IS in the general elections 1990. Later MSP was dissolved.

Defunct political parties in Peru
Political parties established in 1989
Socialist parties in Peru
1989 establishments in Peru
Political parties with year of disestablishment missing